Ketevan Lomtatidze (Georgian:  ქეთევან ლომთათიძე; 1911–2007) was a Georgian linguist (Caucasiologist), specialist in Kartvelian and Abkhaz studies.

Life 
In 1931, she graduated from the department of philology of the Tbilisi State University, specializing in Abkhaz and Abaza language. Some authors regard her as the greatest researcher of these two languages.

She was the first woman to acquire a Doctor of Science degree in Georgia (1945). From 1953 to 1963 and from 1975 to 1987 she worked as the Director of the Institute of Linguistics of the Academy of Sciences of the Georgian SSR.

In 1984, she was awarded the Dmitry Gulia State Prize of Abkhazia.

Throughout her academic career, she published around 400 works (including 8 books) in Georgian, Abkhaz, Russian, English and German language.

Publications
 Ašxaruli dialekʻti da misi adgili sxva apʻxazur-abazur dialekʻttʻa šoris : tekʻstebitʻurtʻ, 1954
 Apʻxazuri da abazuri enebis istoriul-šedarebitʻi analizi , 1976
 Lokalur preverbtʻa żiritʻadi saxeobani da matʻi gapʻormeba apʻxazursa da abazurši, 1981
 Komplekʻstʻagan momdinare bilabialuri xšulebi kʻartʻvelur enebši, 1984

Footnotes

References 

Л. П. Чкадуа / Абхазский биографический словарь. 2015.

1911 births
2007 deaths
Linguists from the Soviet Union
Caucasologists
Abkhaz language
Abaza language
Tbilisi State University alumni